"Men" is a song written by Jerry Hayes and Ronny Scaife, and recorded by American country music artist Charly McClain.  It was released in January 1980 as the third single from the album Women Get Lonely.  The song reached #7 on the Billboard Hot Country Singles & Tracks chart.

Chart performance

References

1980 singles
Charly McClain songs
Epic Records singles
Songs written by Jerry Hayes (songwriter)
Songs written by Ronny Scaife
1980 songs